Totally Gross National Product (abbreviated TGNP) is an American independent record label based in Minneapolis, Minnesota. It was founded by Ryan Olson and Drew Christopherson. It is best known for issuing records by Lizzo, Poliça, and Marijuana Deathsquads.

The label released a 10-track compilation album, Totally Gross National Product 2013 Sampler, in 2013. In 2014, TGNP was named Best Local Record Label in City Pagess "Best of the Twin Cities" poll.

Roster

Albert
Alpha Consumer
Bloodeath
Building Better Bombs
The Cloak Ox
Digitata
Jason Feathers
JM Airis
JT Bates
Kill the Vultures
Leisure Birds
Lewis
Lizzo
Makr
Marijuana Deathsquads

Mel Gibson and the Pants
Moonstone Continuum
Motioner
Mystery Palace
Nicholas L. Perez
Poliça
Pony Bwoy
Roniia
Solid Gold
Spyder Baybie Raw Dog & 2% Muck
Stolyette
Taggart & Rosewood
Tender Meat
Umami
Votel

See also
List of record labels

References

External links

American independent record labels
Companies based in Minneapolis
Record labels established in 2004